Kuheh may refer to:
 Kuheh, Isfahan
 Kuheh, Kerman
 Kuheh 1, Khuzestan Province
 Kuheh 2, Khuzestan Province